The 1967 NHRA Winternationals (commonly known as the Winternats) were a National Hot Rod Association (NHRA) drag racing event, held at Auto Club Raceway, Pomona, California on 5 February.

Events 
More Aggravation III took home both the AA/CD (supercharged A Competition Dragster) trophy and "Best Appearing Car" award.

Results

Top Fuel 
Top Fuel hosted a field of eight.

Round One 
In round one, Jim Bollinger lost do Danny Ongais. Dave Beebe was defeated by Gene Goleman. Conrad "Connie" Kalitta eliminated Mike Snively. Jerry Ruth fell to "Sneaky Pete" Robinson.

Round Two 
In the semi-final, Ongais lost to Goleman and Robinson was eliminated by Kalitta.

Final round 
Kalitta defeated Goleman, winning US$7,500.

Altered 

The Altered class win went to William “Wild Willie” Borsch, at the wheel of the AA/FA Winged Express.

Top Gas 
In the Top Gas final, Kelly Brown lost to Gordon Collett, who claimed a US$3000 prize.

Competition Eliminator 

Middle Eliminator

Little Eliminator

Super Stock 

Eddie Vasquez Jr. and his 1966 Chevy II won Super Stock Eliminator, defeating the 1965 A990 Plymouth of Ed Miller.

Stock 

Graham Douglas and Ed Forys won the 1967 Jr. Stock Eliminator, 14.42 seconds at 95.94 MPH. Defeated 1952 Oldsmobile of Keith Berg.
Source: Junior Stock by Doug Boyce

Notes 

1967 in motorsport
NHRA Winternationals
1967 in California